Neil Roberts may refer to:

Neil Roberts (actor) (born 1964), English actor
Neil Roberts (anarchist) (1960–1982), activist who killed himself when he bombed the New Zealand police database
Neil Roberts (Australian footballer) (born 1933), Australian rules footballer
Neil Roberts (basketball) (born 1945), former American basketball coach
Neil Roberts (politician) (born 1955), Australian politician
Neil Roberts (author) (born 1946), English professor and author
Neil Roberts (racing driver), NASCAR Cup Series driver; see 1953 Southern 500
Neil Roberts (Welsh footballer) (born 1978)
Dr. Neil Roberts, fictional character from American TV series The OC

See also
Neill Roberts (born 1954), soccer player
Robert Neill (disambiguation)